Stephen Gilchrist Glover (born June 13, 1974), known professionally as Steve-O, is an American entertainer, television personality, stunt performer and YouTuber. His career is mostly centered on his performance stunts in the reality comedy television series Jackass (2000–2001) and its related movies, including Jackass: The Movie (2002), Jackass Number Two (2006), Jackass 3D (2010), and Jackass Forever (2022), as well as its spin-off series Wildboyz (2003–2006) and Dr. Steve-O (2007).

Early life and education 
Stephen Gilchrist Glover was born in Wimbledon, London, on June 13, 1974. His mother, Donna Gay Glover (née Wauthier; d. 2003), was Canadian, and his father, Richard Edward "Ted" Glover, is an American of English descent. His maternal step-grandfather was voice-over announcer Wayne Howell. When he was six months old, his family moved to Brazil due to his father's job as president of the South American division of Pepsi-Cola, and Steve-O stated in an interview with Graham Bensinger that his first words were in Portuguese. His family moved from Brazil to Venezuela when he was two, where he learned fluent Spanish; at age four, he moved to Darien, Connecticut; at age six, he moved to Miami; at nine years old, he moved back to England; at age 12, he moved to Toronto; and at age 13, he moved back to England again, remaining there through all four years of high school at the American School in London until he graduated.

He attended the University of Miami to study with the School of Communications, but dropped out after one year due to poor grades and acts of disobedience in school. He also attended the University of New Mexico from 1996 to 1997. He graduated from the Ringling Brothers and Barnum & Bailey Clown College in 1997. After graduation, he was not selected to join the Ringling Brothers and Barnum and Bailey Circus, but worked as a clown in a circus at the Fort Lauderdale Swap Shop flea market. He filmed his stunts, including clown performances, throughout this period.

Career

Jackass and tours (2000–2003)

While performing in the flea market circus, Steve-O began sending videos of himself to Big Brother magazine editor and future Jackass director Jeff Tremaine. Once the connection was made Steve-O began to work on MTV's television series Jackass, which became an instant hit. MTV has subsequently released seven movies based on the series: Jackass: The Movie (2002), Jackass Number Two (2006), direct-to-video release Jackass 2.5 (2007), Jackass 3D (2010), direct-to-video release Jackass 3.5 (2011), Jackass Forever (2022), and Jackass 4.5 (2022). The installments Jackass: The Movie, Jackass Number Two, Jackass 3D, Jackass Presents: Bad Grandpa (2013), and Jackass Forever all became box office hits.

In 2001, he released Don't Try This at Home on DVD, which contained material MTV censored. It went on to sell 140,000 copies. He toured promoting the DVD doing stunts, which was filmed and released as Don't Try This at Home Volume 2: The Tour.

On July 31, 2002, Steve-O was arrested on obscenity and assault charges for stapling his scrotum to his leg, and for being a principal to a second-degree battery, during a performance at a nightclub in Houma, Louisiana on July 11, 2002. After several delays, in March 2003 Steve-O made a deal with Louisiana prosecutors placing him on supervised probation for one year, requiring him to make a charitable donation of $5,000 to a shelter for battered women and children and forbidding him from ever performing in Terrebonne Parish, Louisiana again.

In 2003, Steve-O toured Europe with Bam Margera, a friend and co-star of Jackass. On May 22, 2003, Steve-O was arrested and jailed while in Sweden due to footage of him swallowing a condom containing cannabis to get it past authorities while flying on a plane. He then regurgitated it live on stage, which he showed in his DVD Steve-O: Out on Bail (aka Don't Try This at Home – The Steve-O Video Vol. 3: Out on Bail) (2003). Steve-O reached a deal with the Swedish prosecutors and was released on May 27, 2003 after paying a fine of 45,000 kronor (equal to about US$5,800 at the time). As part of the plea bargain Steve-O admitted to possessing one ecstasy tablet and five grams of marijuana, although he claimed he had no knowledge of where the ecstasy came from. The Swedish arrest was included in the third installment of the DVD series titled Steve-O: Out on Bail. Two months later on July 19, 2003, Steve-O was arrested on charges of disorderly conduct for urinating on potato chips in public during a Lollapalooza tour concert in Burgettstown, Pennsylvania. Steve-O claimed he was kicked off the tour by Lollapalooza producers because of the incident.

After Jackass (2004–2007)
After Jackass ended, he co-starred with Chris Pontius on MTV's Wildboyz, which lasted four seasons from 2003 until 2006. The two performed stunts and acts with animals, often putting themselves in situations for which they were not trained.

In mid-2005, he became the spokesperson for the Sneaux brand of footwear. Television commercials promoting the shoe company include such acts as Steve-O jumping into garbage, getting his foot bitten by an alligator (simulated) and drinking rotten milk. His slogan is "They're darn good shoes."

On March 27, 2006, he and Jackass co-star Chris Pontius visited The Dean Blundell Show, a morning show on Toronto radio station CFNY (102.1 The Edge), to promote their "Don't Try This at Home" tour. He urinated on the floor and performed a stunt called "Unwrapping the Mummy" all in front of a live studio audience. Hosts Dean Blundell, Jason Barr, and Todd Shapiro were suspended for the week following the appearance, after many complaints. In April 2006, Steve-O later sued manager Nick Dunlap and attorney Jason Berk, accusing them of lying to him to fund their lavish lifestyles.

On July 18, 2006, Steve-O became a late contestant on the British reality show Love Island broadcast on ITV from Fiji in an effort to boost ratings. Despite stating he had stopped drinking, he asked for beer while on the show. On July 19, 2006 he abruptly left Love Island because he was not allowed the beer which he had requested.

In November 2006, he went on a drug binge after being misdiagnosed with cardiomyopathy, a serious heart condition. He was later examined by heart specialists who concluded he was in good health.

In 2007, Steve-O starred in his own television show called Dr. Steve-O on the USA Network. In the show, he helped make his guests cool and "de-wussify" them. That same year he appeared in Jackass 2.5, which mainly consisted of material that did not appear in the second Jackass movie. Additionally, he appeared with some Jackass alumni in National Lampoon's TV: The Movie.

On February 25, 2008, he appeared on The Howard Stern Show with Howard Stern, Robin Quivers and Artie Lange on Sirius Satellite Radio to promote his upcoming rap album Hard As a Rock. Another mix-CD released by Steve-O is called The Dumbest Asshole in Hip Hop.

Psychiatric problems and rehab (2008)
On February 23, 2008, Steve-O joined the rest of the Jackass crew for the Jackass MTV 24 Hour Takeover, which promoted JackassWorld.com. He participated in several stunts, and even debuted his rap music video which was executive produced by recording artist D-Jukes, leading to Mike Judge bringing back the duo of Beavis and Butt-head for the first time in years to criticize it. During the live broadcast Steve-O was kicked out of MTV studios on the request of executives for his behavior and intoxication.

On March 9, 2008, after receiving an e-mail from Steve-O that suggested his possible suicide, Steve-O's friends, including co-star Johnny Knoxville, became concerned he was a danger to himself and consulted with physician Drew Pinsky, who told them to get Steve-O to a hospital immediately. Steve-O was placed on a 72-hour psychiatric hold which was later lengthened to 14 days due to an alleged suicide attempt. In a mass e-mail addressed to his friends, Steve-O expressed that he previously had thought of his drug use and bipolarity as a "good thing", but that he now realizes that his drug use was apparently hurting those he loved most. He later stated that his drug use got so bad that he hallucinated an intervention with his friends, humorously stating that he knew he needed help once his hallucinations started urging him to.

On June 4, 2008, Steve-O pleaded guilty to felony possession of cocaine. He avoided jail with the successful completion of a treatment program. In July, after 115 days of sobriety, Steve-O announced he was "back in the loony bin". He returned to the mental institution, he said, because "I've had horrible mood swings and severe depression. My brain is fucked up from using so much cocaine, ketamine, PCP, nitrous oxide, and all sorts of other drugs."

Post-rehab, Jackass reprised and comedy tours (2009–2012)
In March 2009, Steve-O was on the 8th season of Dancing with the Stars, paired with Lacey Schwimmer. After the first week, he complained of pinched nerves and back spasms and did not compete in the second week after injuring his back further by falling on his microphone pack during dress rehearsal. The judges based their scores on his performance at the dress rehearsal. He was eventually eliminated in the sixth week of the competition.

On May 3, 2009, MTV premiered a documentary titled Steve-O: Demise and Rise about how his life was affected by the use of drugs and alcohol. The show featured home-made video footage of Steve-O using drugs and vandalizing his apartment. In an August 2009 interview with Johnny Knoxville for The Times-Picayune, Knoxville on the topic of Steve-O's recovery and rehabilitation said "He's taking to sobriety like he took to drugs and alcohol, I'm very proud of him. I think we'll see him doing some stuff here really soon. As a matter of fact, I know we are." He later stated "Something's coming. We're pretty excited ... I think it'll be a big year next year, but I don't want to talk about it yet."

Steve-O later told Comedy Digital Radio station Barry that he has never seen the MTV documentary. "When I saw the footage of myself doing drugs I felt like I could see them, I could taste them. It made me crave them and as embarrassing as that footage is, that just seemed like another reason to get high. I couldn't watch it; I haven't watched it since then. The producers put it all together and finished it up without any input for me, it's better that way."

Steve-O was part of Jackass 3D, the third installment of the Jackass series, released in October 2010. The movie was in 3D and began production on January 25, 2010. In late May 2010, Knoxville has stated that Steve-O's sobriety is at its best and "There is no beer on set this time around even if some of us wish there was". He also said "And to be honest it's going great. Everyone has had different injuries throughout which is a good sign and Steve-O is probably getting the best footage out of everybody. He is really going for it. He wants to prove to everyone he can do these stunts sober. It's been two years since he had a drink now. Everyone has been real supportive of him.".

When Jackass 3D was released in 2010, the movie broke box office records. In promoting the movie, he appeared on The Howard Stern Show, lighting himself on fire. In reaction, Howard Stern yelled: "Put him out! Put his head out! Fucking maniac! Oh my god, you're a maniac! You're a goddamn maniac!"

In November 2010, Steve-O began touring the United States performing stand-up comedy on what he called "Steve-O's Entirely Too Much Information Tour". In early 2011, he announced a nine-month-long American comedy tour. He appeared in Jackass 3.5, which was released in April 2011.

On March 27, 2011, Steve-O was arrested by Canadian authorities at Calgary airport. Officers found an arrest warrant filed in 2003. Steve-O was accused of assault with a weapon. He was released after paying a caution of $10,000. Before his arrest, Steve-O spoke about
"how he outran police after a fan was, according to authorities, beaten on stage eight years ago."

In May 2011, he took his stand-up show to Australia, playing a show in all the major cities. In an interview with Comedy Digital Radio station Barry, Steve-O explained the genesis of his comedy tour, "Someone invited me to a famous comedy club in Los Angeles and they asked that I get on stage and do something outrageous. When I got to that comedy club I looked around and it occurred to me that the craziest thing I could possibly do by far would be to try stand-up comedy. Like, that was genuinely the most terrifying, outlandish just crazy thing that I could do."

On September 13, 2011, during a taping of the Comedy Central Roast of Charlie Sheen, Steve-O joked, "The last time this many nobodies were at a roast, at least Great White was playing". Steve-O has since apologized for the comment and requested that it be removed from the broadcast of the roast. During the taping of the roast, Steve-O attempted to run into the fist of boxer Mike Tyson, but the first attempt did not work. Later, at the end of the roast, Steve-O made another attempt and this time connected, resulting in Steve-O getting a broken nose. He also claimed to have been sober and clean for three and a half years. Steve-O was also shown to be visibly upset by Amy Schumer's joke about Ryan Dunn's passing, but later stated he was not offended by the joke.

It was announced on October 3, 2011, that Steve-O would be hosting truTV's new reality game show Killer Karaoke, the American version of the British competition show Sing If You Can. The show first aired at 9p.m. EST on November 23, 2012.

He told US Weekly in November 2012 that he credited his two rescue dogs, Walter and Bernie, with helping him to maintain nearly five years of sobriety.

YouTube channel and SeaWorld arrest (2013–2018)
Despite joining in 2005, Steve-O did not regularly upload on his YouTube channel of the same name and other channels until 2013. His main channel SteveO has amassed over 6.05 million subscribers as of February 2022.

In 2014, Steve-O narrated a short video titled "What Came Before, featuring Steve-O: The Truth About Meat and Modern Farms", which was about some of the individual animals rescued by Farm Sanctuary. He also reveals the life of the less fortunate animals that are born into modern farming in the US.

In December 2014, Steve-O was announced as one of the competitors in the second series of British TV show The Jump. He was the ninth contestant eliminated.

On August 9, 2015, Steve-O climbed a construction crane in Los Angeles in a protest against SeaWorld. He lit fireworks and inflated a large whale blow-up doll on top of the crane. He broadcast the stunt on his Facebook page, resulting in LAPD and EMS responding with no knowledge of the stunt going on, and later was arrested after climbing down on charges of trespassing. Fans began a GoFundMe campaign for his bail. For the protest, Steve-O was convicted of two misdemeanors and sentenced to 30 days of jail time and 36 months of probation. Steve-O later admitted that the stunt was poorly thought out as he was nowhere near a SeaWorld. He claims he told his attorney to get jail time because it would increase the publicity and make a statement about captivity. He started his jail time on December 9, 2015. He is quoted saying "I mean, if your goal is to make a statement about captivity, you may as well get yourself locked up!" Steve-O was released from jail after serving just eight hours in the Twin Towers Correctional Facility. In 2016, he released his first stand-up comedy special, Guilty as Charged.

On March 9, 2018, Steve-O marked 10 years of sobriety. On the September 2, 2020 episode 261 of the TigerBelly, Steve-O discusses his work in the 12 step program, especially to address a sex addiction.

Gnarly and Jackass resurgence (2020–present)
On March 19, 2020, Steve-O started his own podcast titled Steve-O's Wild Ride!. He hosts this podcast along with Scott Randolph and Paul Brisske.

Gnarly is Steve-O's second stand-up comedy special at the Gothic Theatre in Denver, Colorado. He presented stories, stunts and previously unseen footage to the audience. The special marks the first time the entire cast of Jackass reunited after the death of Ryan Dunn.  It was released on July 18, 2020 and is available to watch on Steve-O's website.

In August 2020, he appeared on the VENN Network with host Sasha Grey on her show Grey Area.

Steve-O starred in a supporting role in the film Guest House, released on September 4, 2020.

During the first two days of production for Jackass Forever (2022), both Steve-O and Johnny Knoxville were hospitalized. On December 15, 2020, it was publicly announced that Johnny Knoxville and Steve-O were hospitalized due to on-set injuries. Steve-O also broke his collarbone, but that bit was cut out of the movie. He served as a co-producer on Jackass Forever, and Jackass 4.5 (2022).

On July 11, 2021, during Shark Week, the Discovery Channel aired Jackass Shark Week.  It featured Steve-O as well as other Jackass cast members including Knoxville, Chris Pontius, and new cast members Sean "Poopies" McInerney and Jasper Dolphin.

In 2021, Steve-O started going on tour throughout the United States. This tour, titled The Bucket List Tour, features Steve-O telling stories and showing stunts that he wasn't allowed to do for Jackass. He occasionally brings other Jackass members as guests for his live shows. He started going to Australia, and New Zealand in February 2023.

On April 12, 2022, Steve-O announced the title of his new book as A Hard Kick in the Nuts: What I've Learned From a Lifetime of Terrible Decisions, which was released on September 27, 2022.

Personal life 
Steve-O is known for his distinctive gravelly voice, which he initially attributed to his drug use and various stunts he's done over the years. After visiting a specialist, however, he was surprised to learn that it is simply because of his habit of using his throat muscles to talk, rather than his vocal cords.

Animal rights
In 2010, it was reported that Steve-O had become a vegan for both health and compassionate reasons. He stated that "being vegan, I can tell you, has benefited every single area of my life". After the Jackass 3D stunt involving a ram (during which he injured his hand), he has expressed some concern about doing stunts in the future that "mess with animals."

In June 2011, Steve-O released an autobiography entitled Professional Idiot: A Memoir, co-written with David Peisner. He stated that he follows only a strict vegan diet and is one of the many celebrities that got involved in the NOH8 project. In July, he received PETA's Nanci Alexander award for his "voice against cruelty." In 2013, due to his concern about animal rights, he stated that he was eating a vegan diet, and that he did not wear fur or leather.

In December 2018, Steve-O revealed that he was no longer a vegan as he consumes fish and is a pescatarian. In 2019, Steve-O spoke out against "militant" vegans, stating they do more harm than good.

Family
Steve-O spoke about his family life on the September 2, 2020, episode 261 of the podcast TigerBelly with Bobby Lee and Khalyla Kuhn. Steve-O reveals that his mother suffered an aneurysm on October 10, 1998, which was before his rise to fame. Steve-O stated that she suffered major cognitive and physical disability as a result of the aneurysm, and died in 2003.

His father, despite being divorced from Steve-O's mother, returned from England when she suffered an aneurysm. On the TigerBelly podcast, Steve-O describes his father taking a moment outside the hospital to express regret for not fully supporting Steve-O's unconventional career path. Up to that point, Steve-O had not yet seen the success that the Jackass series would bring, and was a contrast to the corporate leadership career his father followed.

Filmography

Films

Television

DVDs

Video games

Music videos

Web series

Discography
2008 – The Dumbest Asshole in Hip Hop (hosted by Whoo Kid)

includes a bonus DVD (51:30)

See also
 List of animal rights advocates

References

External links

 
 
 
  (main)
  (podcasts)

1974 births
20th-century English comedians
21st-century American male musicians
21st-century American rappers
21st-century English comedians
American activists
American animal rights activists
American clowns
American hip hop musicians
American male rappers
American people of Canadian descent
American people of English descent
American stand-up comedians
American stunt performers
American tattoo artists
American YouTubers
British expatriates in Brazil
British stunt performers
Comedians from London
English activists
English animal rights activists
English clowns
English expatriates in the United States
English game show hosts
English hip hop musicians
English male actors
English male rappers
English people of American descent
English people of Canadian descent
English television personalities
Jackass (TV series)
Living people
Male actors from Albuquerque, New Mexico
Male actors from London
Male actors from Miami
Participants in American reality television series
People educated at The American School in London
People from Wimbledon, London
Rappers from London
Rappers from Miami
Rappers from New Mexico
University of Miami School of Communication alumni
University of New Mexico alumni
Writers from Albuquerque, New Mexico
Writers from London
Writers from Miami